E. Elavarasan also known as Ela' is a Malaysian football manager who is the Head coach of Malaysia U23 & Assistant coach for Malaysia national football team. On 23 February 2022, He was chosen by manager and head coach of Malaysia Kim Pan-gon as assistant local coach due to his experience and high achievement in Malaysia football, under recommendation by Technical Director of Malaysia national team ( FAM ) Scott O'Donell

Coaching career
He is a former Selangor state team player, last playing for Selangor Dunhill state league side, Public Bank in the mid-eighties before starting a coaching career with them. He is regarded as a top caliber coach having guided Public Bank FC to winning the FAM League and gaining promotion to the Premier League. After a good season in the Premier League in 2003, he drove the team a step further by winning promotion to the  Super League and finishing in 2nd place the following season.

After Public Bank FC decided to end their participation in the league, he was signed by Malacca FA and guided them into the Super League on the first year itself. Subsequently, he took the offer from Datuk Goh Seng Chong, the Vice President of Malacca FA to join his organization as the General Manager of Cubic Integrated Sport and Recreation. Both Arsenal Soccer School and Cubic Academy of Football were under him.

In mid-season 2010, Felda United signed Elavasaran after their coach, Reduan Abdullah, was suspended by the FAM.  Elavasaran guided them to win the Premier League and gain promotion to the Super League for the 2011 season. Elavasaran led Felda United FC to the quarter final of the 2012 Malaysia Cup.

On 18 October 2012, he moved to coach Terengganu FA, signing a 1-year contract. Terengganu under Elavarasan only managed to placed ninth in the 2013 Malaysia Super League, and failed to get past the group stage of 2013 Malaysia Cup, in what proved to be his only season with the East Coast team.

For the 2015 season he joins PKNS F.C. as their new head coach. Among his achievements in PKNS includes becoming the 2016 Malaysia FA Cup finalist, where his team lose to Johor Darul Ta'zim F.C. 1-2 in the final. He was removed from his position as PKNS head coach in July 2017, due to a string of poor results in all competitions.

In May 2018, he was hired by Melaka United F.C. for the second time, this time as replacement for their sacked head coach Eduardo Almeida. Signing a 4-month contract, he succeeded in preventing Melaka from being relegated, but announced in October the same year he will not continue coaching the team after his contract ended.

In 2019, he was appointed as PDRM head coach after replacing Mohd Fauzi Pilus who only managed to secure 1 point in the cops first 7 matches. Not only did E.Elavarsan saved PDRM from relegation, the Cops catapulted their way for promotion to the super league in 2020, but yet again in that the same year he step down from coaching PDRM once his contract ended.

In 2020,he was hired by Sarawak United with the objective to secure promotion into the Malaysian Super league.Despite the setbacks of financial diffculties and the impact of Covid-19,E.Elavarasan was able to finish second place in the 2021 season with ease.E.Elavarasan was ment to lead Sarawak United for the 2022 season.Due to the high demand of other teams both parties agreed to resignation of E.Elavarasan with mutual consent.

References

Malaysian people of Indian descent
Malaysian football managers
1965 births
Living people
People from Selangor